Township 6 is a township in Rooks County, Kansas, United States.

History
Rooks County was established with four townships: Bow Creek, Lowell, Paradise and Stockton. That number increased to seven by 1878 and twenty three in 1925. The twenty three townships were in place until 1971 when the number was reduced to the current twelve townships.

Township 6 was formed from Rooks County townships Belmont and Rush in 1971 pursuant to Kansas Statute 80-1110. 80-1110 allowed for the disorganization of townships and assigning those territories to contiguous townships.

Ash Creek and Sand Creek flow through the northern part of Township 6. Lost Creek flows through the southern part of Township 6 to South Fork Solomon River.

Belmont Township
Belmont Township was established around 1878 from part of Stockton Township. The South Fork Solomon River traversed the township where a dam was built to form Webster Reservoir.

Rush Township
Rush Township was established in 1880 from part of Stockton Township.

Parks and Recreation
Webster State Park and Webster Reservoir are located in Township 6.

References

Townships in Rooks County, Kansas
Townships in Kansas